The Argolic Gulf, also known as the Gulf of Argolis, is a gulf of the Aegean Sea off the east coast of the Peloponnese, Greece. It is about 50 km long and 30 km wide. Its main port is Nafplio, at its northwestern end. At the entrance to the gulf is the island Spetses. This gulf and its islands are sometimes combined with the Saronic Gulf and Saronic Islands, with the result called the Argo-Saronic Gulf and the Argo-Saronic Islands. It is surrounded by two regional units: Arcadia to the southwest and Argolis to the north and east. The river Inachos drains into the Argolic Gulf near Nea Kios. The main islands in the gulf are Psili, Plateia and Bourtzi, a small island with a Venetian fortress that protects the port of Nafplio. The surrounding mountains protect it from the strong summer Meltemi wind.

The main towns that lie around the gulf are, from southwest to east:
Tyros
Paralio Astros
Myloi
Nea Kios
Nafplio
Tolo or Tolon, on Tolo Bay
Porto Cheli
Spetses

Gallery

References

External links

Gulfs of Greece
Gulfs of the Aegean Sea
Landforms of Argolis
Landforms of Peloponnese (region)
Landforms of Arcadia, Peloponnese
Landforms of Islands (regional unit)
Landforms of Attica